Actual Sounds + Voices is the sixth studio album by electronic music group Meat Beat Manifesto, released in 1998. Like its predecessor, Subliminal Sandwich, the album deeply intertwines multiple forms of electronic music with live instruments such as the bass clarinet, saxophone, drums and Fender Rhodes. However, Actual Sounds + Voices is more influenced by jazz, coupled with a darker tone and characterized by persistent erratic breakbeats. The single "Prime Audio Soup" is featured in a scene of the 1999 film The Matrix and appears on the film's soundtrack.

Track listing
"Everything's Under Control"—0:43
"Prime Audio Soup"—6:17
"Book of Shadows"—5:43
"Oblivion/Humans"—5:52
"Let's Have Fun"—3:30
"The Tweek"—2:25
"Acid Again"—5:47
"Let Go"—4:44
"Where Are You?/Enuff"—5:59
"Hail to the Bopp"—4:40
"3 Floors Above You"—5:00
"Funny Feeling"—6:10
"The Thumb"—10:47
"Wavy Line"—1:17
"Wildlife"—4:05

Personnel
Jack Dangers - Producer, vocals, bass
Lynn Farmer - Drums, percussion
John Wilson - Prepared guitars

Additional musicians
Bennie Maupin - Saxophones, bass clarinet on "The Thumb"
Patrick Gleeson - Synthesizer on "The Thumb"

In popular culture
The song "Prime Audio Soup" can be heard as background music for the ring girls at 20:42 in the 2002 documentary film The Smashing Machine: The Life and Times of Extreme Fighter Mark Kerr, and featured on the main soundtrack of the 1999 film The Matrix.

References

Meat Beat Manifesto albums
1998 albums
Nothing Records albums